The 1999 Jack Milne Cup was the second staging of the annual Jack Milne Cup.

Meeting Details
September 26, 1999
 Costa Mesa, California

Speedway in the United States
Jack Milne Cup, 1999
Speedway
Jack Milne Cup